Forestal is a solvent used in chromatography, composed of acetic acid, water, and hydrochloric acid in a 30:10:3 ratio by volume. It is useful for isolating anthocyanins in room-temperature chromatography using standard filter paper.

References 

 
 Pecket, R.C. Constituents of Leaf Extracts ... , New Phytologist 1959 Oct; 58(2) (retrieved 27 sept 2010 http://onlinelibrary.wiley.com/doi/10.1111/j.1469-8137.1959.tb05350.x/pdf )
 Stecher, G. and Bonn, G. K., Phytochemical Analysis, Chromatography, Elsevier Science, E. Heftmann (ed), Amsterdam, pp. 1050.  (2004) (retrieved via google books 9/27/2010)

Solvents
Chromatography
Anthocyanins